Upper Clatford is a village and civil parish in Hampshire, England.

Along this path is evidence of the old railway line although little is seen of the earlier canal that preceded the railway. The canal and later railway were important to the local economy, in particular for the transport of raw materials from Southampton via Andover to Upper Clatford for Taskers of Andover, whose premises were in nearby Anna Valley. Pig Iron was shipped from Southampton via the canal to Taskers Wharf, originally where the footpath now leaves Upper Clatford for Andover. The road south out of the village leads to the twin village of Goodworth Clatford (formerly Lower Clatford).

Clatford is an old English term meaning 'the ford where the burdock grows'. The village historically contained four manors: Norman Court, Sackville Court, Clatford Manor and Clatford Mills.

Stephen Hopkins, passenger on the Mayflower and one of the signatories of the Mayflower Compact, was born and baptized at Clatford. Some years prior to his sailing on the Mayflower he was on the Sea Venture, bound for Jamestown, Virginia, when it ran aground during a storm in Bermuda in 1609. In Bermuda he led an unsuccessful mutiny, was sentenced to death but managed to obtain a pardon. Thereafter he partook in the construction of two boats from remnants of the Sea Venture and sailed to Jamestown where he spent several years before returning to England, sometime between 1614 and 1616. In 1620 he joined the Mayflower on its voyage to the new world, together with his two children, Constance and Giles. His knowledge of the ways of the indigenous population and wilderness survival (acquired in Jamestown) proved very useful to the Plymouth Colony. Stephen Hopkins died in Plymouth Colony in 1644.

Significant buildings at Clatford include thatched cottages and houses including the local public house The Crook and Shears, and the local parish church of All Saints, which was first built probably during the reign of Henry I (1100-1135). It was rebuilt in the sixteenth century and transformed into an 'auditory church' in the seventeenth. The Church sits between two arms of the Pillhill Brook; the village war memorial is within its grounds.

References

External links
 Taskers of Andover - A History
 

Villages in Hampshire
Civil parishes in Hampshire